The Las Vegas Seagulls was an American soccer club based in Whitney, Nevada that was a member of the American Soccer League.

1979 Roster
 Ronan Downs 
 Miodrag Lacevic

Coaches
Raul Carrizo

Year-by-year

References

Sports teams in Las Vegas
Defunct soccer clubs in Nevada
American Soccer League (1933–1983) teams
1979 establishments in Nevada
1979 disestablishments in Nevada
Soccer clubs in Nevada
Association football clubs established in 1979
Association football clubs disestablished in 1979